Samahat Ayatollah Al-Sayyed Riyadh Al-Hakeem.

Biography 
is the son Alsayyed Muhammad Saeed al-Hakim, he was born in 1958 in Holy Najaf. He studied at the scientific Hawzah in Holy Najaf and continued at the scientific level to advanced stages .

His Certificates 
He held the master's degree from Lahore University and International Mustafa University and he held the title of Ayatollah at the scientific Hawzah. 
He is a professor in graduate studies on Jurisprudence and Quran interpretation, he supervises on doctorate and master dissertation, a member of the curriculums reviewing committee at the scientific Hawzah, he has many books in Jurisprudence and the principles of Jurisprudence and Quran sciences and other field.
He is arrested during Saddam's regime for more than eight years, he has written memorandums about the duration of arresting, he is a representative of the grand Ayatollah AlSayyed Muhammad Said Al-Hakeem out of Iraq and he supervises on several offices of Marjiyyah in several Asian and African countries, he is the founder and supervisor on kalima center for dialogue an cooperation which has social and cultural activities in several Asian and African countries.

Kalima Center for Dialogue and Cooperation 
He is the founder and supervisor on Kalima Center for Dialogue and Cooperation, he has participated in many social and cultural conferences and symposiums in many European, Asian and Australian countries .     
He arranged and participated  many conferences and he receives ongoing delegations of researchers and investigators who are visited Holy Najaf, he contributes in many cultural projects that prove humanitarian coexistence concept and culture exchanging .

References

External links  
 صحيفة دنيا الوطن تتحدث عن مركز الكلمة للحوار والتعاون  .
 سفارة جمهورية العراق في برلين  .
 مؤسسة النور للثقافة والاعلام .
 موقع حقائق .
 صحيفة صوت العراق الالكترونية  .
 مؤسسة اليتيم الخيرية  .
 موقع شفقنا نيوز   .
 موقع كتابات في الميزان .
 شبكة اخبار النجف.
 مكتب المرجع الديني محمد سعيد الحكيم .
 وكالة انباء براثا   .
 وكالة النجف نيوز .
 صحيفة المرايا الالكترونية  .
 صحيفة اللواء  .
 الموقع الايزيدي (بحزاي).

Iraqi ayatollahs
Living people
Al-Hakim family
1934 births
20th-century Islamic religious leaders
21st-century Islamic religious leaders